Sebastián Eduardo Páez Aravena (born 13 August 1986) is a Chilean former footballer who played as a midfielder.

Club career
Romanian club FC Brașov has announced on 11 June 2011 that they have loaned Páez for the following season.

International career
He represented Chile at under-20 level in the 2005 FIFA World Youth Championship.

Honours
 Primera B de Chile: 2013–14

References

External links

1986 births
Living people
People from La Serena
Chilean footballers
Chile under-20 international footballers
Chilean expatriate footballers
Deportes La Serena footballers
Unión San Felipe footballers
Provincial Osorno footballers
Curicó Unido footballers
FC Brașov (1936) players
San Marcos de Arica footballers
Deportes Temuco footballers
A.C. Barnechea footballers
Ñublense footballers
Chilean Primera División players
Liga I players
Primera B de Chile players
Association football midfielders
Chilean expatriate sportspeople in Romania
Expatriate footballers in Romania